Ernest Demetrious Hondros  (February 18, 1930 – September 13, 2016) was a British material scientist, and visiting professor at Imperial College London.

Life
He was born in Kastelorizo in Greece. He grew up in Queensland. He earned a Doctor of Science (DSc) degree from the University of Melbourne. He was Director of the Petten Establishment, at the Joint Research Centre.

Honours and awards
Elected a Fellow of The Royal Society (FRS)
Appointed Companion of the Order of St Michael and St George (CMG)
Doctor of Science Honoris Causa, Melbourne University and University of London
Dr d’U (Paris) –Doctor of the Universite de Paris, France
Member d'Honneur, Societe Francaise de Metallurgie
Rosenhain Medal (Metals Society, U.K.)
Howe Medal (American Society of Metals)
A. A. Griffith Medal and Prize

References

British materials scientists
Fellows of the Royal Society
Companions of the Order of St Michael and St George
Academics of Imperial College London
1930 births
2016 deaths
University of Melbourne alumni